The Time Machine Did It is a comical novel by American author John Swartzwelder, known for his work on popular cartoon sitcom The Simpsons. The novel stars klutzy detective Frank Burly, who gets embroiled in time travel and criminal activity during his attempts at helping his new client. The Time Machine Did It was Swartzwelder's first book, and the first in a series of novels featuring Burly; the next book, How I Conquered Your Planet, was released in 2006.

Plot 
Frank Burly, a private investigator, gets hired by an 18-year-old kid to beat up another detective. Later, in a cafe, he sees a strange man using what appears to be a time machine. He goes over to the guy, but he refuses to tell Burly anything of what happened. Then, Burly is hired to find a precious artifact stolen from a man named Mandible. Frank Burly begins to suspect Mandalible, who claims he is a multi-millionaire, is merely a crazy person, and that the artifact stolen from him doesn't exist.

Burly finds the house of a Professor E. Groggins, which was robbed by Burly's criminal friend Small-Time Charlie. Burly investigates Charlie, and as he digs deeper into the mystery, he gets more threats telling him to back off from the case. Everyone Burly interrogates refuses to tell him about the time machine Burly had found in Groggin's basement-laboratory. Burly is even captured by the criminals of Central City, who drug him and lock him in a cell. He escapes but is lured back in a trap by a beautiful lady named Cola who pretends to be interested in him. Burly is thrown in a prison cell where Groggins and others who have gotten too close to the truth reside.

Everyone seems to be from a different time period, thanks to Groggin's time traveling device, and everyone thinks their time period is better than everyone else's. Groggins and Burly work together to pull off multiple elaborate escapes, but none of them works and Burly finally gets out by shooting himself out of a missile silo, and finds two criminals unrespectfully throwing Groggins' suitcase onto the ground. He takes the suitcase, but doesn't know how to work it and ends up with multiple versions of his past and future selves in the room. Trying to return the Burlys to their time, Frank accidentally ends up in the 1940s, and recruits a scientist to develop a briefcase-like time machine for Burly to use. It only sends him forward five hours, so Burly yells at the scientists the returns the materials.

To make matters worse, Burly is arrested because all his money was minted in the future, but is released when he tells his guard about the future, even though most of it is remembered falsely. Still, Burly has minimal money, and is able to book an unfurnished hotel room for only ten cents and wakes up in the morning refreshed. He discovers that even in this "primitive" time that his detective skills are terrible, so he tries to find work elsewhere. He gets a few day jobs, but at night he tries to invent things that haven't been made yet, like the ball-point pen and penicillin. He also starts making merchandise for events that will happen in the future.

All these ideas fail, though, so Burly retires to spending most of his nights at the local bar, where he wows the other patrons with stories about the future. Soon enough, Burly spots a man who looks like Mandible and is carrying the very artifact Burly was hired to find, as well as the time briefcase. Burly tries to buy the artifact off the man, but he refuses and Burly walks away with only the briefcase. He arrives back in the future, but when Mandible sees him without the artifact, he tells since the man Burly saw with the briefcase gave the artifact to the police and corrupted them, the future is now dystopian and evil. For many months, Burly travels through different time periods and finally finds the artifact, which he returns to Mandible.

Now, Mandible is still poor, but Burly is rich, and he throws Mandible out the window when he sues. Groggins cleans up the timeline, and Burly finally gets to relax.

Reception 
The book was general well received by reviewers. On Amazon, most reviewers gave the book five stars, calling it a "comedic masterpiece" and "one of the funniest books [ever]." A review on Schlock Value also commented on Swartzwelder's writing style, comparing it to his writing in episodes of The Simpsons. Schlock Value also likened to the main character, Frank Burly, also comparing him to The Simpsons character Homer Simpson. The same was said about the book on Goodreads.

Sequels 

The book is the first in the Frank Burly series and if followed by ten currently released books, including The Exploding Detective, Burly Go Home and The Spy With No Pants.The Time Machine Did It is succeeded by How I Conquered Your Planet.

References

External links 
 JohnSwartzwelder.com

2004 American novels
2004 science fiction novels
American science fiction novels
Comic science fiction novels
2004 debut novels
American detective novels